Magnesium nitride, which possesses the chemical formula Mg3N2, is an inorganic compound of magnesium and nitrogen. At room temperature and pressure it is a greenish yellow powder.

Preparation 

 By passing dry nitrogen over heated magnesium:

 or ammonia:

History 
When isolating argon, William Ramsay passed dry air over copper to remove oxygen and over magnesium to remove the nitrogen, forming magnesium nitride.

Chemistry
Magnesium nitride reacts with water to produce magnesium hydroxide and ammonia gas, as do many metal nitrides.

Mg3N2(s) + 6 H2O(l) → 3 Mg(OH)2(aq) + 2 NH3(g)

In fact, when magnesium is burned in air, some magnesium nitride is formed in addition to the principal product, magnesium oxide.

Thermal decomposition of magnesium nitride gives magnesium and nitrogen gas (at 700-1500 °C).

At high pressures, the stability and formation of new nitrogen-rich nitrides (N/Mg ratio equal or greater to one) were suggested and later discovered. These include the Mg2N4 and MgN4 solids which both become thermodynamically stable near 50 GPa. The Mg2N4 is composed of exotic cis-tetranitrogen N44− species with N-N bond orders close to one. This Mg2N4 compound was recovered to ambient conditions, along with the N44− units, marking only the fourth polynitrogen entity bulk stabilized at ambient conditions.

Uses
Magnesium nitride was the catalyst in the first practical synthesis of borazon (cubic boron nitride).

Robert H. Wentorf, Jr. was trying to convert the hexagonal form of boron nitride into the cubic form by a combination of heat, pressure, and a catalyst. He had already tried all the logical catalysts (for instance, those that catalyze the synthesis of diamond), but with no success.

Out of desperation and curiosity (he called it the "make the maximum number of mistakes" approach), he added some magnesium wire to the hexagonal boron nitride and gave it the same pressure and heat treatment. When he examined the wire under a microscope, he found tiny dark lumps clinging to it. These lumps could scratch a polished block of boron carbide, something only diamond was known to do.

From the smell of ammonia, caused by the reaction of magnesium nitride with the moisture in the air, he deduced that the magnesium metal had reacted with the boron nitride to form magnesium nitride, which was the true catalyst.

Magnesium nitride has also been applied to synthesize boron nitride nanocrystals and nitrides of aluminum and Group 3 metals.

References

Further reading
 
     

Nitrides
Magnesium compounds